Zakrzewski (feminine: Zakrzewska, plural: Zakrzewscy) is a Polish surname. At the beginning of the 1990s there were approximately 26,210 people in Poland with this surname.

People named Zakrzewski:

 Alex Zakrzewski, American television director
 Andrzej Zakrzewski (1941–2000), Polish politician
 Arseni Zakrzewski (1783–1865; Arseniy Zakrevskiy), Russian politician
 Barbara Maria Zakrzewska-Nikiporczyk (born 1946), Polish composer and musicologist
 Bogdan Zakrzewski (1916–2011), Polish literary historian
 Dariusz Zakrzewski (born 1961), Polish cyclist
 Eulalia Zakrzewska-Rolińska (b. 1946), Polish sport shooter
 Ignacy Wyssogota Zakrzewski (1745–1802), Polish nobleman and politician
 Jadwiga Zakrzewska (born 1950), Polish politician
 Jan Dołęga-Zakrzewski (1866–1936), Polish surveyor, activist and publicist
 Jan Andrzej Zakrzewski (1920–2007), Polish journalist, writer and translator
 Jan Zakrzewski (athlete) (born 1970), Polish athlete
 Janina Zakrzewska (1928–1995), Polish lawyer
 Janusz Andrzej Zakrzewski (1932–2008), Polish physicist
 John Zakrzewski (born 1982), French pentathlete
 Karolina Zakrzewska, Polish model
 Kazimierz Zakrzewski (1900–1941), Polish historian and publicist
 Konstanty Zakrzewski (1876–1948), Polish physicist
 Ksawery Zakrzewski (1876–1915), Polish doctor and activist
 Łukasz Zakrzewski (born 1984), Polish sailor
 Marie Elizabeth Zakrzewska (1829–1902), German-born physician
 Mirosława Zakrzewska-Kotula (1932–1990), Polish volleyball, basketball, handball player and coach
 Pierre Zakrzewski (1967–2022), Irish photographer and journalist
 Roman Zakrzewski (1955–2014), Polish painter
 Ryszard Zakrzewski (lived in the 19th century), Polish traveler, topographer and officer
 Stanisław Zakrzewski (1873–1936), Polish historian
 Stanisław Zenon Zakrzewski (1890–1976), Polish sailing activist
 Tadeusz Paweł Zakrzewski (1883–1961), Polish Catholic priest and bishop
 Wincenty Zakrzewski (1844–1918), Polish historian
 Witold Zakrzewski (1903–1987), Polish sailing activist
 Włodzimierz Zakrzewski (1916–1992), Polish painter, graphician and poster artist
 Zbigniew Zakrzewski (economist) (1912–1992), Polish economist
 Zbigniew Zakrzewski (soccer player) (b. 1981), Polish football (soccer) player
 Zofia Zakrzewska (1916–1999), Polish scoutmaster

See also
 
 
 Bugaj Zakrzewski, settlement in Poland
 Zakrzewska Osada, village in Poland
 Zakrzewska Wola, Grójec County, village in Poland
 Zakrzewska Wola, Radom County, village in Poland

References

Polish-language surnames
Toponymic surnames